Buchholz is a German surname.

During the Austro-Hungarian empire, in the kingdom of Hungary people of non-Hungarian ethnicity—people of Jewish, German and Slovak ancestry—were encouraged to adopt Hungarian surnames. Some people with German names translated them directly into Hungarian. Some of them just magyarized their original German surname Buchholz into the Hungarian form Bukholczer.

Notable people with the surname include:

 Barbara Buchholz (1959–2012), German musician and composer
 Bob Buchholz (born 1957), American voice actor in anime films
 Butch Buchholz (born 1940), American former tennis player
 Christine Buchholz (born 1971), German politician, Die Linke (The Left) member of the Bundestag
 Clay Buchholz (born 1984), American baseball player (pitcher)
 Detlev Buchholz (born 1944), German theoretical physicist
 Erich Buchholz (1891–1972), German painter
 Francis Buchholz (born 1984), German rock n' roll bass player
 Fyodor Buchholz (1857–1942), Russian-Soviet painter
 Horst Buchholz (1933–2003), German actor
 John Theodore Buchholz (1888–1951), American botanist
 Justin Buchholz (born 1983), American MMA artist
 Ludwig Heinrich Buchholtz (1740–1811), Prussian diplomat
 Matthias Buchholz (born 1957), German violist
 Max Buchholz (1875–1956) , engineer (who invented the Buchholz relay)
 Peter Buchholz (1837–1892), rabbi
 Quint Buchholz (born 1957), German painter, illustrator and author
 Reinhold Wilhelm Buchholz (1837–1876), German zoologist
 Sabrina Buchholz (born 1980), German biathlete
 Scott Buchholz (born 1968), Australian politician
 Taylor Buchholz (born 1981), American baseball player
 Todd G. Buchholz, economic policy commentator
 Werner Buchholz (historian), German historian
 Werner Buchholz (born 1922), American computer scientist who coined the term "byte"
 Garth Von Buchholz, Canadian author

References
 Stefania Ruzsits Jha (2002), Reconsidering Michael Polanyi's Philosophy, p. 7. "In the Hungarian part of the monarchy non-Hungarian ethnic people were encouraged to adopt Hungarian surnames and to learn the Hungarian language in addition to the several others they were already speaking."
 Pieter M. Judson, Marsha L. Rozenblit (2005), Constructing nationalities in East Central Europe, p. 41. "While some people with German names translated them directly into Hungarian (hence the draftsman Nikolaus Liebe—in English, Nicholas Love—became Miklos Szerelmey), others were more inventive in their choice of Hungarian surnames.
 A Country Study: Hungary–"Hungary Under the Habsburgs". Federal Research Division. Library of Congress. Retrieved 2009-04-14.

External links 
 

German-language surnames
Lists of people by surname